During the 2003–04 Dutch football season, PSV Eindhoven competed in the Eredivisie.

Season summary
Despite the 31 goals of Mateja Kežman, PSV failed to retain their title.

First-team squad
Squad at end of season

References

PSV Eindhoven seasons
PSV Eindhoven